Events from the year 1812 in Scotland.

Incumbents

Law officers 
 Lord Advocate – Archibald Colquhoun
 Solicitor General for Scotland – David Monypenny

Judiciary 
 Lord President of the Court of Session – Lord Granton
 Lord Justice General – The Duke of Montrose
 Lord Justice Clerk – Lord Boyle

Events 
 1 January – Tron riot in Edinburgh concludes.
 March – meeting in Edinburgh to discuss formation of the Scottish Widows Fund and Life Assurance Society.
 6 July – the Kilmarnock and Troon Railway becomes the first public railway line to open in Scotland. It begins life as a 9.5-mile (16-kilometre), horse-drawn waggonway to carry coal from Kilmarnock to Troon harbour. On 27 June the horse-drawn passenger coach Caledonia began running over the line between Troon and Gargieston, near Kilmarnock.
 12 July (The Twelfth) – first Protestant Orange march in Scotland held in Glasgow, attracting hostile Catholic crowds.
 August – Henry Bell's  begins a passenger service on the River Clyde between Glasgow and Greenock, the first commercially successful steamboat service in Europe.
 November – first bridge at Bonar Bridge completed in cast iron to the design of Thomas Telford.
 Ongoing – Highland Clearances.
 Nelson's Tower completed in Forres as a monument to Lord Nelson.
 Brackla distillery built by Captain William Fraser of Brackla House on the estate of Cawdor Castle.
 Glasgow Bible Society established.
 Gaelic chapel opens in London.

Births 
 3 February – William Fraser Tolmie, scientist and politician in Canada (died 1886 in Canada)
 29 February – James Milne Wilson, Premier of Tasmania (died 29 February 1880 in Tasmania)
 26 March (probable date) – Charles Mackay, writer (died 1889)
 4 April – George Grub, church historian (died 1892)
 27 May – Robert Stirling Newall, engineer and astronomer (died 1889)
 3 June – Norman Macleod, Church of Scotland minister (died 1872)
 2 September – Kirkpatrick Macmillan, inventor of the bicycle (died 1878)
 23 December – Samuel Smiles, author and reformer (died 1904)

Deaths 
 23 January – Robert Craufurd, general (mortally wounded during Peninsular War) (born 1764)
 14 May – Duncan Ban MacIntyre, Gaelic poet (born 1724)

The arts
 William Tennant's ottava rima mock-heroic poem Anster Fair is published, the first use of this Italian style in Britain.

See also 
 Timeline of Scottish history
 1812 in the United Kingdom

References 

 
Scotland
Years of the 19th century in Scotland
1810s in Scotland